John Crosse (born c. 1939) is a British former radio DJ, presenter and continuity announcer, known for being one of the voices of the Yorkshire Television region of Independent Television for nearly 30 years.

Career
Crosse began his broadcasting career on pirate station Radio London in the 1960s, (where, he used the pseudonym John Sedd). He then moved to work for sales company Radiovision, which sold airtime for a couple of pirate radio stations. Later, he read the news on BBC Radio 4, and then joined Southern Television for a short stint as continuity announcer for the channel.

In the early 1970s, he joined Yorkshire Television where he was noted for his authoritative RP accent, shared by a number of his colleagues at YTV, such as Redvers Kyle; the company's presentation was much more similar to BBC Television (out-of-vision announcers with RP accents) than that of other ITV companies at the same time, some of which used friendlier in-vision announcers.

Along with the rest of the announcing team at YTV, Crosse also voiced trailers produced by the company's promotions department for the ITV network, and from 1996 to 1998, he was also heard announcing for Tyne Tees Television. He also narrated the second series of the long-running schools history drama How We Used to Live.

He worked on Yorkshire TV until he retired in November 1998. He now resides in the United States.

References

External links
 tv-ark.org.uk - Various continuity announcements made by John Crosse on YTV.

Radio and television announcers
1939 births
Living people
Yorkshire Television